St. Mary's Church is a historic Episcopal church in Abingdon, Maryland. It is a small Gothic Revival parish church  It was built about 1851 and carefully designed in the "Early English" manner with gray rubble stone walls, cut Port Deposit granite trim, and a very steep slate-covered roof. It features an ornamental chimney, with a fleur-de-lis, the symbol of the Virgin Mary, in a bas-relief panel.  It is the only church in America to have a complete set of stained glass windows designed by William Butterfield, the English Gothic Revival architect. Johannes Oertel did the chancel paintings.

It was listed on the National Register of Historic Places in 1973.

Notable interments
James H. Broumel (died 1948), Maryland delegate
James McLean (died 1956), Maryland delegate

References

External links
, including undated photo, at Maryland Historical Trust

Churches completed in 1851
19th-century Episcopal church buildings
Episcopal church buildings in Maryland
Gothic Revival church buildings in Maryland
Churches in Harford County, Maryland
Churches on the National Register of Historic Places in Maryland
1851 establishments in England
National Register of Historic Places in Harford County, Maryland